Ooni Gboonijio was the 15th Ooni of Ife, a paramount traditional ruler of Ile Ife, the ancestral home of the Yorubas. He succeeded Ooni Ajimuda and was succeeded by  
Ooni Okanlajosin.

References

Oonis of Ife
Yoruba history